Christopher Brent Wood (born September 19, 1995), known professionally as Brent Faiyaz, is an American R&B singer. He rose to prominence after he was featured on the GoldLink single "Crew" alongside Shy Glizzy in 2016, which was certified 6× Platinum by the RIAA, and earned him a nomination for the Grammy Award for Best Rap/Sung Collaboration.

In 2021, his singles, "Wasting Time" featuring Drake and The Neptunes, "Gravity" with DJ Dahi featuring Tyler, the Creator, and "Mercedes", all earned him entries on the Billboard Hot 100. Faiyaz's second album Wasteland debuted at number two on the Billboard 200 chart.

Early life 
Brent Faiyaz born Christopher Brent Wood was born and raised in Columbia, Maryland. Faiyaz started making music at the age of 12. His parents were not always understanding of his dreams as a musician; which Faiyaz said was warranted because his love for music "always distracted" him.

Career

2013–2016: Early career and A.M. Paradox 
Faiyaz began uploading his experimental music onto SoundCloud in 2014. During that time he moved from his hometown Columbia, Maryland, to Charlotte, North Carolina, before settling in Los Angeles, California, to further his music career. On January 19, 2015, he released his debut single "Allure". On June 1, 2016, Faiyaz released "Invite Me", the lead single from his debut EP. On September 19, 2016, his 21st birthday, the EP entitled A.M. Paradox was released and received positive reviews from music critics.

In October 2016, Brent Faiyaz formed a group named Sonder with record producers Dpat and Atu. The group released their debut single, "Too Fast," on October 25. On December 16, 2016, Faiyaz was featured alongside rapper Shy Glizzy on the single "Crew" by rapper GoldLink.

2017–present: Into, Sonder Son, Fuck the World, and Wasteland 
On January 26, 2017, Sonder released their debut EP Into, for which Duplion named them their "Artist of the Month" for January 2017. The EP was also ranked 23rd by Complex on its list of "The Best Albums of 2017 (So Far)" on June 6, 2017. On June 21, 2017, Faiyaz was featured in the remix for GoldLink's "Crew," which also featured Shy Glizzy and included rapper Gucci Mane. On March 8, 2019, Faiyaz featured on the song "Demonz (Interlude)" from Juice Wrld's second studio album Death Race for Love.

Faiyaz released his second EP, Fuck the World, on February 7, 2020. It peaked at number 20 on the US Billboard 200. On September 18, 2020, a day before his birthday, he released the single "Dead Man Walking". He returned with a new single, "Gravity", on January 29, 2021. Produced by DJ Dahi, the song features Tyler, the Creator, who provides a "spacey" verse, while Faiyaz sings of "uncertain love and raps in a distilled voice praising loyalty from his female companion". On February 8 , he released a new song titled "Circles", alongside a video. He is currently working on a new album, titled Make It Out Alive, which is in the early recording process. On July 1, 2021, Faiyaz released a new single, "Wasting Time" featuring Drake. Following this, he appeared on tracks from Baby Keem's The Melodic Blue ("Lost Souls") and Tems's If Orange Was a Place ("Found"). On December 3, Faiyaz released the single "Mercedes", after having teased a project titled Wasteland on Instagram.

Musical style and influences 
Faiyaz has referred to Lauryn Hill as his biggest influence. When speaking to Fact, Faiyaz stated "It was Lauryn Hill who inspired me to start singing from early on".

He has also cited artists such as Currensy, Lil Wayne, Curtis Mayfield, and Gil Scott-Heron among his inspirations.

Discography

Studio albums

Extended plays

Singles

As lead artist

As featured artist

Other charted songs

Notes

References

External links 
 
 
 

1995 births
Living people
Musicians from Baltimore
American contemporary R&B singers
Alternative R&B musicians
Record producers from Maryland
21st-century African-American male singers
American singers of Dominican Republic descent